Hydroscand is a Swedish family-owned business that sells and distributes hose and fluid components. The company is represented in over 20 countries in Europe, Asia and Africa. Hydroscand Group has 1 400 employees at over 250 branches, and has a turnover of 295 MEUR.
Hydroscand AB was established in Stockholm, in 1969. Establishment of branches began in the seventies, with the first one in Linköping. In Sweden, Hydroscand has over 70 hose service branches and a nationwide mobile hose service, known as HoseExpress. 
Today the headquarters is located in Sköndal, Stockholm and operates a decentralized business with branches across Europe, Asia and Africa.

History 

The company was formed in a small basement in Örby, a suburb of Stockholm, in 1969. During the mid-seventies, branches were established in Sweden.

In November 2019, Hydroscand Group announced that Frida Norrbom Sams was appointed as the new President and CEO of the company.

References 

Engineering companies of Sweden
Multinational companies headquartered in Sweden
Companies based in Stockholm
Business services companies established in 1969
Swedish companies established in 1969